Uvalde is a city and the county seat of Uvalde County, Texas, United States. The population was 15,217 at the 2020 census.

Name
Uvalde was founded in 1853 as the town of Encina, but was renamed in 1856 as Uvalde. Its name is a misspelling of the Spanish governor Juan de Ugalde (Cádiz, Andalusia, 1729–1816).

Pronunciations of the name of the town vary. One common pronunciation is the fully Anglicized version. There are also pronunciations that combine the English and Spanish versions. The chosen pronunciation often shows how strong a person's connection with the Hispanic community is or general knowledge of its pronunciation.

History
Uvalde was founded by Reading Wood Black in 1853 as the town of Encina. In 1856, when the county was organized, the town was renamed Uvalde after Spanish governor Juan de Ugalde (Cádiz, Andalusia, 1729–1816) and was chosen as county seat. It is the southern limit of the Texas Hill Country and is part of South Texas. Uvalde is known for its production, dating back to the 1870s, of huajillo honey (also spelled guajillo), a mild, light-colored honey.

On May 24, 2022, 19 children and two adults were murdered during the Robb Elementary School shooting, while 18 other people survived.

Geography
Uvalde is located at the crossroads of U.S. Hwy 90 and U.S. Hwy 83.

Climate
The climate in this region is characterized by hot, humid summers and mild, dry winters. According to the Köppen climate classification system, Uvalde has a humid subtropical climate, Cfa (inclining toward Cwa), on climate maps.

Demographics

2020 census
As of the 2020 United States census, there were 15,217 people, 5,217 households, and 3,663 families residing in the city.

2010 census
At the 2010 census, the population was 15,751.

2000 census
As of the census of 2000, 14,929 people, 4,796 households and 3,716 families resided in the city. The 5,313 housing units averaged 790.1 per square mile (305.3/km). The racial makeup of the city was 78.3% Hispanic or Latino, 19.2% White, 0.47% African American, 0.62% Native American, 0.48% Asian, 0.07% Pacific Islander, 0% from other races, and 2.97% from two or more races.

Of the 4,796 households, 41.8% had children under the age of 18 living with them, 55.6% were married couples living together, 16.9% had a female householder with no husband present, and 22.5% were not families; 20.1% of all households were made up of individuals, and 10.4% had someone living alone who was 65 years of age or older. The average household size was 3.02 and the average family size was 3.50.

About 32.4% of the population was under the age of 18, 9.6% from 18 to 24, 25.7% from 25 to 44, 18.3% from 45 to 64, and 14.0% was 65 years of age or older. The median age was 31 years. For every 100 females, there were 90.3 males. For every 100 females age 18 and over, there were 85.5 males.

The household median income was $25,259 and for a family was $27,897. Males had a median income of $25,600 compared with $15,674 for females. The per capita income for the city was $11,735. About 24.2% of families and 29.0% of the population were below the poverty line, including 40.1% of those under age 18 and 23.8% of those age 65 or over.

Education
Uvalde is within the Uvalde Consolidated Independent School District, which operates Uvalde High School. Southwest Texas Junior College has a campus next to Uvalde on the site of Garner Field. The Garner Field facility also houses a campus of Sul Ross State University.

Robb Elementary Massacre 

On May 24, 2022, 19 children under the age of 12 and two teachers were murdered by a gunman in a school shooting in Uvalde, leaving 17 survivors injured. The shooter's grandmother survived after being shot before the gunman drove to Robb Elementary School, where he entered the building without opposition. Local officers, believing the shooter to be barricaded safely inside the school, stood outside waiting for further instruction. Video shows local officers forcing parents behind police tape, pinning them down, and threatening to tase them, preventing them from trying to save their children's lives. After an hour, the shooter was then killed when the BORTAC agents returned fire.

Arts and culture
The John Nance Garner House in Uvalde, which was home to John Nance Garner for 30 years, chronicles his life. Garner served as Speaker of the United States House of Representatives from 1931 to 1933, and as Franklin D. Roosevelt's Vice President from 1933 to 1941. Also in Uvalde are:

 The Aviation Museum at Garner Field has displays of World War II aircraft.
 The Briscoe Art and Antique Collection displays the collection of former Texas governor Dolph Briscoe.
 The Janey Slaughter Briscoe Grand Opera House hosts community theater and concerts.

Parks and recreation
Uvalde is known as one of the best locations for gliding in the United States. It was the site of the 1991 and 2012 World Gliding Championships. The Uvalde area of the Texas Hill Country is home to many native and exotic species of animals, which allow sportsmen almost year-round hunting opportunities.

Outdoor Life magazine named Uvalde County one of the best white-tailed deer hunting areas in the world.

Notable people

 Oscar Albarado, world champion boxer
 Bobby Bonner, former MLB shortstop
 Dolph Briscoe, former governor of Texas
 Pete Conrad, former astronaut, resident for 30 years
 Dale Evans, actress
 King Fisher, gunslinger, sheriff of Uvalde County 1881 and 1883, buried in Uvalde 
 John Nance Garner, the 32nd Vice President of the United States
 Pat Garrett, Old West lawman, killer of Billy the Kid, one time resident of Uvalde
 Carlos Guevara, former MLB pitcher
 Harvey Hildebran, former Texas state representative
 Dave Hilton, former MLB third baseman
 Ben Kinchlow, former co-host of The 700 Club
 Matthew McConaughey, Oscar-winning actor
 Vann McElroy, former NFL star and Super Bowl winner
 Tom O'Folliard, American outlaw, friend of Billy the Kid
 Brooks Raley, MLB pitcher for the New York Mets
 Marshall Ashmun Upson, American journalist, ghostwriter of Pat Garrett's 1882 book The Authentic Life of Billy, the Kid, buried in Uvalde

See also

 Reading Wood Black

Notes

References

Sources

External links

 City of Uvalde official website
 2022 Uvalde city council districts election map
 Uvalde Area Chamber of Commerce

 
Cities in Texas
Cities in Uvalde County, Texas
County seats in Texas
Micropolitan areas of Texas
Populated places established in 1853
San Antonio–San Diego Mail Line
Stagecoach stops in the United States